Delhi  is an unincorporated community in Jersey County, Illinois, United States. It is located about five miles southeast of Jerseyville and about seven miles northwest of Godfrey along US Highway 67.

History
Delhi was originally called Lurton's, and under the latter name was founded by the Lurton family, and named for them. A post office was established at Lurton's in 1833, and the post office was renamed Delhi in 1836.

Education
Delhi was served by the public K-12 Jersey Community Unit School District 100. District schools in Delhi included Delhi Elementary School. The school was closed in June 2012 due to district realignment.

Notable people

 Carrie Thomas Alexander-Bahrenberg, operated a street railway system

References

Unincorporated communities in Illinois
Unincorporated communities in Jersey County, Illinois